Regimantas Adomaitis (31 January 1937 – 20 June 2022) was a Lithuanian film and stage actor. He was also active in Russia and Germany.

Career
Adomaitis was born in Šiauliai.  He graduated from the Faculty of Physics and Mathematics at Vilnius University. Later he studied in Vilnius Conservatoire. 

In 1985, he was a member of the jury at the 35th Berlin International Film Festival. Adomaitis has received many awards of recognition. In 1988 he with another 34 prominent people created Sąjūdis Reform Movement, which eventually led to the declaration of independence of Lithuania on 11 March 1990.

He lived in Vilnius, the capital of Lithuania, where he worked as an actor at the Lithuanian National Drama Theatre.

Filmography 
 Nobody Wanted to Die (1966) 
 East Corridor (1966) 
 Feelings (1968) 
 King Lear (1971) 
 That Sweet Word: Liberty! (1973) 
 Devil's Bride (1974) 
 Centaurs (1978) 
 Faktas (1981) 
 The Trust That Has Burst (1983) 
 Moscow Saga (2004)

References

External links

 
Biography 

1937 births
2022 deaths
People from Šiauliai
Lithuanian male film actors
Lithuanian male stage actors
Soviet male stage actors
Soviet male film actors
People's Artists of the USSR
Vilnius University alumni
20th-century Lithuanian male actors
21st-century Lithuanian male actors